The Serbian Orthodox Church in North and South America is a constituent and integral part of the one and only Serbian Orthodox Church (Patriarchate) and therefore the jurisdiction of the Serbian Orthodox Church (SPC) in the Americas. It has five eparchies (dioceses), that were reorganized in 2009. It also has a central church council made up of diocesan bishops, and almost 220 churches, chapels, monasteries and sketes in the United States, Canada, and South and Central America.

History

The arrival of the first Serbian Orthodox Christian emigrants to the Americas began in the first half of the 19th century. One only needs to read the life stories of Michael Pupin and Nikola Tesla and the lesser-known personalities such as Rado Radosavljević to understand the impact of immigration period of the time. When young adventurous Serbs came to California, there were Slavonians there to welcome them. There was a Slavonian at John Sutter's Mill when James W. Marshall found gold there. He was the one they called "Sailor Man". Slavs were in America mining gold even before Marshall's find. The Russians found gold in their colonies of Fort Ross and Bodega in 1812. Stories abound about Slavonians marrying daughters of Spanish Dons in California and even a Hawaiian princess. The famous Tadich Grill on California Street in San Francisco was established by Slavonians on Commercial Street in that city way back in 1849. The first secretary of the California Land Commission was George Fisher (Đorđe Šagić). George Fisher came to America in 1825 and is remembered as an eminent American pioneer.

It is no surprise that Serbs came to Amador and Calaveras counties in the late 19th century. Many of the mining companies in those counties were Slavonian-owned or managed. They also came to the United States of America via Mexico, then under the rule of an Austrian Archduke Maximillian who was dubbed "the last King of Mexico". Those were mainly Serbs from the Austrian Empire (later Austria-Hungary) who emigrated to Mexico, though found more opportunities north of Tijuana. Also, many of them were sailors on Adriatic sailing ships that called on California ports before and during the California Gold Rush. Other Serbian sailors who came by sailing ships to the Gulf of Mexico decided to make their home in New Orleans, Louisiana. Later, these same Serbs joined the ranks of fighting men in Slavonian Rifles 1st Co., Slavonian Rifles 2nd Co., Slavonian Rifles Company Infantry Battalion Louisiana Legion, Austrian Guards 4th Regiment European Brigade, Cognevich's Company 4th Regiment European Brigade. Names like Russian Turchin and Serb-Montenegrin Cognevich (Konjević) of New Orleans who organized his own company and became its captain are now part of American Civil War history.

By the end of the century, more Serbian immigrants continued to come from Austria-Hungary, from the Kingdom of Serbia, Principality of Montenegro and from the Ottoman Empire since not all Serbian territories were emancipated at the time. Emigration was mainly directed to the United States and Canada where industries thrived. Among emigrants, there were several Serbian Orthodox priests, and by the end of the 19th-century first parish communities were established and churches built. Wrote Fern A. Wallace in his 1974 book, "The Flame and the Candle", that the city of Douglas (since merged with Juneau, Alaska) was a very rich mining town at the turn of the century. During this time, large groups of Serbs from Montenegro came to Douglas to work in the gold mines of the Treadwell Company. Among these Serb pioneers arose the traditional desire to establish their own church as well as their own print shop. An article told of the first Serbian pioneers in Alaska and their fraternal efforts to build a church for themselves and for the generations of Serbs in Alaska. These documents were signed by 286 members of the Saint Sava Church, eight members of the church board and three priests, headed by Archimandrite Sebastian Dabovich in Douglas, Alaska.

After the gold rush days, many of these pioneers moved to the big cities where they formed social groups. One of the first societies they organized with other Slavonians was the Slavonian Illyrian Benevolent Society of San Francisco in 1857. A branch of this society, one of many branches in California, was established in Sutter Creek, California in 1872. The Sutter Creek branch erected a lodge building on the society's property in 1874. This was the earliest recorded Slavonian social hall built in western America. Others followed suit: Amador County Serbs organized the "St. Sava Church Organization" of Amador County in 1886. These early societies provided many services to their members and the community. They tended the ill: gave help to the aged; and provided burial services for the deceased. They organized annual celebrations of Saint Sava's Day, the patron saint of the Serbian people (Savin Dan), and Vidovdan commemorating the Battle of Kosovo in 1389. They met to listen to famous guslars, to sing their cherished songs, and to dance the kolo. The members of the "Saint Sava Church Organization"  of Amador County played a major role in the building of St. Sava Church in Jackson.

Therefore, the San Francisco Bay area can be rightly considered one of the first centers of Orthodox Christianity in the United States, as Serbs played a major role in its early development by forming the "Russian, Greek, Serbian Organization of San Francisco" in 1864. Most of the early members of this organization were Serbs. There are documents showing that there were attempts to enlist a Serbian Orthodox priest from Kotor to serve a community as early as the 1870s. Of these early Orthodox priests in America, we know very little about them because of the scarcity of sources on their missions. Somehow more is known of the activities of American-born Father Sebastian Dabovich and the Archimandrite Firmilijan, who came from Serbia to serve the Serbs in Chicago in 1892. It was due primarily to their efforts and to the efforts of the priests who followed them.

In 1893-1894, Saint Sava Serbian Orthodox Church was built in  Jackson, California, thanks to the efforts of priest Sebastian Dabovich, who was the first Eastern Orthodox priest born in the USA. Since there was no Serbian Diocese in the US, parishes that were formed during that period were temporarily placed under the jurisdiction of the Russian Orthodox Diocese in North America.

In the eave of the First World War, first steps were made towards the creation of a particular Serbian Orthodox Diocese in the United States, under the ecclesiastical jurisdiction of the Serbian Orthodox Church. It was officially established as the Serbian Orthodox Diocese of America and Canada, in 1921, by the Holy Synod of the Serbian Orthodox Church. In 1923, the administration of the Diocese was entrusted to archimandrite Mardarije Uskoković, who was elected and consecrated as Serbian Orthodox bishop of America and Canada in 1926. After his death in 1935, the diocese was administered until the election of a new bishop Dionisije Milivojević in 1939 who arrived in the U.S. in 1940 to assume the position.

By the middle of the 20th century, the network of Serbian Orthodox communities in the US and Canada was much expanded due to constant immigration, and soon after the Second World War, it was proposed on several occasions to reorganize the wast continental diocese by division into two or three regional dioceses. Those proposals were opposed by Bishop Dionisije who favored centralized administration. Gradually, various administrative problems escalated and by 1963 final decisions were made by the central authorities of the Serbian Orthodox Church to reorganize and divide the diocese into three regional dioceses.

In 1963, the Serbian Orthodox Church in the USA and Canada was organized thusly: 
 Serbian Orthodox Diocese of Eastern America and Canada 
 Serbian Orthodox Diocese of Midwestern America 
 Serbian Orthodox Diocese of Western America

In 1983, a fourth diocese was created specifically for Canadian churches: the Serbian Orthodox Diocese of Canada.

The reorganization was strongly opposed by bishop Dionisije, who was supported by several fractions of Serbian political emigration in the USA. The conflict resulted in schism since Dionisije refused to recognize decisions of the Holy Synod. Thus, two parallel ecclesiastical structures were created, the official "patriarchal" branch organized into three dioceses, and an alternative "free" branch headed by Dionisije, who was officially deposed.

Eparchies
 Serbian Orthodox Eparchy of Buenos Aires and South America - bishop Kirilo Bojović
 Serbian Orthodox Eparchy of Canada - bishop Mitrofan Kodić
 Serbian Orthodox Eparchy of Eastern America - bishop Irinej Dobrijević
 Serbian Orthodox Eparchy of New Gračanica and Midwestern America - bishop Longin Krčo
 Serbian Orthodox Eparchy of Western America - bishop Maksim Vasiljević

Monasteries
 St. Sava Serbian Orthodox Monastery, located at the Episcopal headquarters of the Serbian Orthodox Eparchy of Eastern America, Libertyville, Illinois
 New Gračanica Monastery, located at the Episcopal headquarters of the Serbian Orthodox Eparchy of New Gračanica and Midwestern America, Third Lake, Illinois
 Episcopal headquarters of the Serbian Orthodox Eparchy of Western America, located at Saint Steven's Serbian Orthodox Cathedral, Alhambra, California
 Holy Transfiguration Serbian Orthodox Monastery, Milton, Ontario, Canada
 Episcopal headquarters of the Serbian Orthodox Eparchy of Buenos Aires and South America, Buenos Aires, Argentina
 Monastery of St. Paisius, Safford
 St. Pachomious Monastery
 St. Archangel Michael Skete
 Saint Herman of Alaska Monastery
 St. Mark Serbian Orthodox Monastery
 St. Xenia Serbian Orthodox Skete
 Shadeland: Most Holy Mother Of God Monastery (Springboro, Pennsylvania)
 Sheffield Lake, Ohio: St. Mark Serbian Orthodox Monastery (Sheffield, Ohio)
 Richfield, Ohio: Synaxis: St. Archangel Gabriel Serbian Orthodox Monastery, also known as "New Marcha", Richfield, Ohio
 St. Nikolaj of Žiča Monastery (China, Michigan)

Schools and Academies
 St. Sava Serbian Orthodox Seminary
 St. Sava Orthodox School
 St. Sava Academy

Notable churches
 Trinity Chapel Complex, Manhattan, New York
 Saint Sava Serbian Orthodox Church (Jackson, California)
 St. Sava Church (Douglas, Alaska)
 Saints Constantine and Helen Serbian Orthodox Church, Galveston, Texas
 Saint Sava Serbian Orthodox Church (Merrillville, Indiana)
 St. Sava Serbian Orthodox Cathedral (Milwaukee), Wisconsin
 Holy Trinity Serbian Orthodox Church (Montreal), Quebec
 Saint Arsenije Sremac Serbian Orthodox Church, Whitby, Ontario
 Saint Petka Serbian Orthodox Church, Lakeshore, Ontario
 Saint Nicholas Serbian Orthodox Cathedral (Hamilton, Ontario)
 All Serbian Saints Serbian Orthodox Church (Mississauga)
 Saint Sava Serbian Orthodox Church (Toronto)
 Saint Michael the Archangel Serbian Orthodox Church (Toronto)
 Holy Trinity Serbian Orthodox Church (Regina), Saskatchewan
 St. Stefan Serbian Orthodox Church (Ottawa)
 St. Sava Serbian Orthodox Church (Vancouver), British Columbia

Museum
 Serbian Home

See also
 Eastern Orthodoxy in Ecuador
 Serbs in USA
 Serbs in Canada
 Serbs in South America

References

Sources

External links
 

Eastern Orthodox Church bodies in North America
Eastern Orthodox Church bodies in South America
Serbian Orthodox Church in the United States
Serbian Orthodox Church in Canada
Orthodox Church
Orthodox Church